Hassell is a town in Martin County, North Carolina, United States. The population was 84 at the 2010 census.

Geography

Demographics

As of the census of 2000, there were 72 people, 32 households, and 20 families residing in the town. The population density was 266.2 people per square mile (103.0/km2). There were 33 housing units at an average density of 122.0 per square mile (47.2/km2). The racial makeup of the town was 37.50% White, and 62.50% African American.

There were 32 households, out of which 15.6% had children under the age of 18 living with them, 43.8% were married couples living together, 15.6% had a female householder with no husband present, and 37.5% were non-families. 34.4% of all households were made up of individuals, and 12.5% had someone living alone who was 65 years of age or older. The average household size was 2.25 and the average family size was 2.85.

In the town the population was spread out, with 19.4% under the age of 18, 1.4% from 18 to 24, 26.4% from 25 to 44, 27.8% from 45 to 64, and 25.0% who were 65 years of age or older. The median age was 46 years. For every 100 females there were 100.0 males. For every 100 females age 18 and over, there were 100.0 males.

The median income for a household in the town was $12,250, and the median income for a family was $19,167. Males had a median income of $29,375 versus $38,750 for females. The per capita income for the town was $12,498. There were 33.3% of families and 30.0% of the population living below the poverty line, including 38.5% of under eighteens and 63.6% of those over 64.

References

External links

Martin County, North Carolina